The JGR Class 3380 consisted of four Vauclain compound 2-6-2T wheel arrangement steam locomotives of the Japanese Government Railways. They were built by the San'yō Railway as numbers 125-128 and inherited by the JGR under nationalization in 1907. They continued to serve on the San'yō Main Line until 1919, when they were sent to Hokkaido. All four were scrapped in 1925.

Accidents
No. 3382 was involved in an accident in Kobe on 28 November 1918 when it pushed two other locomotives into the harbor due to incorrectly set brakes.

See also
 Japan Railways locomotive numbering and classification

2-6-2 locomotives
Steam locomotives of Japan
1067 mm gauge locomotives of Japan
Vauclain compound locomotives
Scrapped locomotives